Romeo Community Schools is a school district headquartered in Romeo, Michigan, in Metro Detroit. Todd R. Robinson is the superintendent.

Schools
Romeo Community Schools consists of the following schools:

High schools:
 Romeo High School

Middle schools:
 Romeo Middle School

Elementary schools:
 Amanda Moore Elementary School
 Hamilton Parsons Elementary School
 Hevel Elementary School
 Indian Hills Elementary School
 Washington Elementary School

Others:
 9th Grade Academy
 Croswell Early Childhood Center
 Romeo Engineering and Technology Center

References

External links
 

School districts in Michigan
Education in Macomb County, Michigan